A list of notable Uruguayan lawyers:

Alberto Abdala
Pablo Abdala
Washington Abdala
Sergio Abreu
Eduardo Acevedo Maturana
Rafael Addiego Bruno
Gonzalo Aguirre
Luis Almagro
Raúl Alonso de Marco
Sofía Álvarez Vignoli
José Amorín Batlle
Alejandro Atchugarry

B

Luis Barrios Tassano
Hugo Batalla
Jorge Batlle
Washington Beltrán Barbat
Washington Beltrán Mullin
Azucena Berrutti
Daniel Blanco Acevedo
Juan Carlos Blanco Acevedo
Juan Carlos Blanco Estradé
Juan Carlos Blanco Fernández
Domingo Bordaberry
Pedro Bordaberry
Sara Bossio
Alfeo Brum
Baltasar Brum

C

Milton Cairoli
Juan Campisteguy
Diego Cánepa
Lorenzo Carnelli
Jorge Chediak
Juan Vicente Chiarino
Eduardo Juan Couture

D

Alberto Demicheli
Daniel Díaz Maynard
Ramón Díaz (economist)
Guillermo Domenech

E

Martín Echegoyen
José Eugenio Ellauri

F

Pedro Figari
Emilio Frugoni

G

Héctor Grauert
Julio César Grauert
Héctor Gros Espiell

H

Luis Alberto de Herrera

I

J

Eduardo Jiménez de Aréchaga

L

Luis Alberto Lacalle
Luis Alberto Lacalle Pou
Jorge Larrañaga
Jorge Larrieux

M

Alejandro Magariños Cervantes
Carlos Maggi
Antonio Marchesano
Martín C. Martínez
Tomás de Mattos
Aparicio Méndez
Pablo Mieres

N

O

Didier Opertti
Jorge Orrico

P

Jorge Pacheco Klein
Ope Pasquet

Q

Carlos Quijano

R

Juan Andrés Ramírez
Siegbert Rippe
Alba Roballo
Hipólito Rodríguez Caorsi
Eduardo Rodríguez Larreta
Jorge Ruibal

S

Julio María Sanguinetti
Walter Santoro
Enrique Sayagués Laso
Héctor Martín Sturla
Michelle Suárez Bértora

T

Enrique Tarigo
Pablo Troise

U

V
 Leslie van Rompaey

W

Claudio Williman
José Claudio Wílliman

Z

Alberto Fermín Zubiría
Alberto Zumarán

 
Lawyer